Jang Ki-bum (born May 22, 1990) is a South Korean actor.

Filmography

Film

Television series

Music video

Awards and nominations

References

External links
 Jang Ki-bum at Humane Entertainment 
 
 
 

1990 births
Living people
South Korean male film actors
South Korean male television actors
South Korean male child actors
21st-century South Korean male actors